
The following lists events that happened during 1847 in South Africa.

Events
 The Cape Colony's boundary is extended to Orange River and the districts of Victoria East and British Kaffraria are annexed
 The Montagu Pass is opened
 Sugar cane plantations are started in Natal
 The settlement of East London is established
 Robert Gray is ordained as the first Bishop of Cape Town in Westminster Abbey, London

Births
 9 July - Henrietta Stockdale, pioneer of nursing in the Cape Colony, is born in Nottinghamshire, England
 22 October - Jacobus Herculaas de la Rey, Boer general, is born near Winburg, Free State

References
See Years in South Africa for list of References

 
South Africa
Years in South Africa